That Dam (Lao  ທາດດຳ, meaning Black Stupa) is a large stupa located in Vientiane, Laos. Many Laotians believe it is inhabited by a seven-headed nāga who tried to protect them from an invasion by the Siamese army in 1827.

Stupas
Buildings and structures in Vientiane